The 2018 WK League was the tenth season of the WK League, the top division of women's football in South Korea.

In the off-season, Icheon Daekyo ceased operations, while Changnyeong WFC joined the league. Suwon FMC (Suwon Facilities Management Corporation) changed its name to Suwon UDC (Suwon Urban Development Corporation).

The regular season began on 23 April 2018 and ended on 22 October 2018. Incheon Hyundai Steel Red Angels were the defending champions.

Teams

Draft
The 2018 WK League Draft was held on 27 December 2017 at the Koreana Hotel in Seoul. The following players were picked:

Notes:
 Boeun Sangmu were not allowed to select any players in the main draft because of their military status.

Foreign players
The total number of foreign players was restricted to three per club, including a slot for a player from the Asian Football Confederation countries. Boeun Sangmu were not allowed to sign any foreign players because of their military status.

Table

Results

Matches 1 to 14

Matches 15 to 28

Play-offs
The semi-final was contested between the 2nd and 3rd placed teams (Gyeongju KHNP and Suwon UDC) in the regular season.  After defeating Suwon UDC 2–0, Gyeongju KHNP advanced to the two-legged final to face the 1st placed team (Incheon Hyundai Steel Red Angels) in the regular season.

The semi-final was played as a single-elimination match, and the Championship Final over two legs.

Semi-final

Final
First leg

Second leg

Attendance

Average home attendances
Ranked from highest to lowest average attendance.

References

External links
WK League official website
WK League on Soccerway

2018
Women
South Korea
South Korea